Muderaz Hoseyn (also Romanized as Mūderāz Ḩoseyn; also known as Mūderāz) is a village in Howmeh Rural District, in the Central District of Gilan-e Gharb County, Kermanshah Province, Iran. At the 2006 census, its population was 39, in 7 families.

References 

Populated places in Gilan-e Gharb County